Angie may refer to:

People
 Angie (given name)
 Ängie, a Swedish pop singer
 Angie Vázquez, Mexican singer

Arts and entertainment
 Angie (album), a 1978 Angela Bofill album
 "Angie" (song), a 1973 single by The Rolling Stones
 Angie (TV series), an ABC sitcom
 Angie (1994 film), starring Geena Davis
 Angie (1993 film), a Dutch film directed by Martin Lagestee
 Angie (novel), a 2007 Slovenian novel
 "Angie", a 2007 song by Cobra Starship from ¡Viva la Cobra!

Other uses
 Angie, Louisiana, a village in the US
 Angie (mango), a named mango cultivar originating in south Florida

See also

 Angela (disambiguation)
 Ange (disambiguation)
 Anji (disambiguation)